Michael Fleming (born 1943) is an Irish former Gaelic footballer. He played at club level with a number of clubs in Kerry and Cork and at senior level with the Kerry county team.

Honours
University College Cork
Cork Senior Football Championship: 1963, 1964

St Finbarr's
Cork Intermediate Football Championship: 1970

Kerry
All-Ireland Senior Football Championship: 1969
Munster Senior Football Championship: 1964, 1965, 1968, 1969, 1970
National Football League: 1962-63, 1968-69
Munster Under-21 Football Championship: 1962

References

External links
 Mick Fleming profile at the Terrace Talk website

1943 births
Living people
UCC Gaelic footballers
Currow Gaelic footballers
Castleisland Gaelic footballers
St Finbarr's Gaelic footballers
Bishopstown Gaelic footballers
Kerry inter-county Gaelic footballers
Munster inter-provincial Gaelic footballers